Roksana Emilia Węgiel (born 11 January 2005), also known as Roxie, is a Polish singer who rose to fame in her native country after winning season one of the Polish version of The Voice Kids in 2018. She represented Poland in the Junior Eurovision Song Contest 2018 with the song "Anyone I Want to Be", and went on to win the competition becoming the first Polish entrant to win the Junior Eurovision Song Contest.

Her eponymous debut studio album was released in 2019. She is the recipient of the 2019 MTV Europe Music Award for Best Polish Act.

Early life
Węgiel was born in Jasło, Poland, to Rafał and Edyta. She has two younger brothers, Maksymilian and Tymoteusz. As a child, she competed in artistic gymnastics and ballroom dancing, and additionally competed in judo internationally. Węgiel began singing at age eight, during a karaoke concert at a judo camp in Croatia.

Career

2018–present: The Voice Kids and Junior Eurovision
Węgiel's professional singing career began in 2017, when she auditioned for season one of the Polish version of The Voice Kids. At her blind audition, she sang "Halo" by Beyoncé, and had all three coaches turn their chairs for her, eventually joining the team of Polish singer-songwriter Edyta Górniak, who represented Poland at the Eurovision Song Contest 1994. When Górniak first heard Węgiel's voice, she described her as "unreal" and stated that she did not believe even Beyoncé had such a strong voice at that age. Węgiel was declared the winner in the final on 24 February 2018, during which she performed Górniak's 1994 Eurovision entry "To nie ja!", and an original song "Żyj". After winning the competition, she was signed to Universal Music Polska, and released her second single "Obiecuję". In October 2018, Węgiel collaborated with Górniak on the single "Zatrzymać chwilę", recorded for the soundtrack of the Polish version of the film Hotel Transylvania 3: Summer Vacation.

On 21 September, Węgiel was announced by Polish broadcaster Telewizja Polska (TVP) as Poland's entrant in the Junior Eurovision Song Contest 2018, to be held in Minsk, Belarus. Her song for the competition, titled "Anyone I Want to Be", was written by an international team consisting of Polish singer Lanberry, Danish producer Cutfather, British-American songwriter Maegan Cottone, and Danish-Norwegian musician Daniel Heløy Davidsen. The song was released on 6 November, with its official music video being released the same day. The video surpassed one million views on YouTube within two weeks, becoming the most-watched video of the 2018 contest. The competition was held on 25 November, where Węgiel was eventually crowned the winner, placing first with the viewing public and seventh with the professional juries. Węgiel is the first Polish entrant to win the Junior Eurovision Song Contest.

On 12 April 2019, Węgiel released the single titled "Lay Low", which drew criticism for its racy lyrics branded by some as inappropriate for her age. Her eponymous debut studio album followed in June, and was later certified Platinum in Poland. On 22 August 2019, she was announced as one of the hosts for the Junior Eurovision Song Contest 2019 along with Ida Nowakowska and Aleksander Sikora, which took place in November. During the event, she also performed as an interval act. In October 2019, Węgiel went on her first tour, The X Tour, in support of her debut album. At the 2019 MTV Europe Music Awards, she won the award for Best Polish Act.

At the Junior Eurovision Song Contest 2020, hosted in Poland for the second consecutive year, Węgiel performed the song "Arcade" as an interval act, together with Junior Eurovision 2019 winner Viki Gabor and Eurovision 2019 winner Duncan Laurence.

Discography

Studio albums

Singles

As featured artist

Promotional singles

Awards and nominations

References

External links

2005 births
Child pop musicians
Junior Eurovision Song Contest entrants
Junior Eurovision Song Contest winners
MTV Europe Music Award winners
Living people
Polish child singers
Polish pop singers
People from Jasło
The Voice Kids contestants
21st-century Polish singers
21st-century Polish women singers